The Ptarmigan Tunnel was built in 1930 through the Ptarmigan Wall at an elevation of  in Glacier National Park, near Many Glacier, in Montana, US. The  manmade tunnel allows hikers to avoid a strenuous climb over very steep terrain between Many Glacier and the Belly River valley. Two opposing steel jackhammers drilling from either side of the tunnel and a series of ten-hole rounds of dynamite gradually broke through the mountain in less than three months.

A wide area, originally for guide and tourist horses, extends from each portal with a masonry retaining wall. Natural rock lines the interior walls. Heavy iron doors were hung across the tunnel adits during the summer of 1975. They remain open from mid-July until October 1, weather permitting. Designed by Ole Westman, this trail tunnel embodies exceptional qualities of landscape architecture and engineering in a pedestrian-scaled tunnel, cut through a sheer mountain wall.

References

See also
Ptarmigan Lake
Burro Schmidt Tunnel

Transportation buildings and structures on the National Register of Historic Places in Montana
Tunnels on the National Register of Historic Places
Transportation in Glacier County, Montana
National Register of Historic Places in Glacier County, Montana
1930 establishments in Montana
Pedestrian tunnels in the United States
National Register of Historic Places in Glacier National Park
Tunnels in Montana